The Hong Kong New Wave is a film movement in Chinese-language Hong Kong cinema that emerged in the late 1970s and lasted into the early 2000s.

Origins of the movement

The Hong Kong New Wave started in 1979 with the release of numerous notable films. During the 1980s, the Hong Kong film industry began to flourish. Film emerged as the most popular form of entertainment in Hong Kong, in part due to the fact that many Chinese households did not have a TV at the time. Many of the New Wave directors had a Western-style education and were influenced by western filmmaking and culture. The films of the Hong Kong New Wave were not stylistically homogenous, rather the term was used to mark the distinction of a new generation of filmmakers. Films of the Hong Kong New Wave utilized new technology and techniques such as synchronous sound, new editing techniques, and filming movies on location.

First Wave and Second Wave
The Hong Kong New Wave is considered to have two distinct periods. The first period, also called the "Hong Kong New Wave" or alternatively called the "First Wave", began in the late 1970s and lasted into the mid to late 1980s. The second period, called the "Second New Wave", is considered to have begun in 1984, after the New Wave began to gain attention from international audiences. Directors of the Second New Wave include Stanley Kwan, Wong Kar-wai, Mabel Cheung, Alex Law, Fruit Chan, Peter Chan, and Tammy Cheung.

First Wave 
 Cops and Robbers (Alex Cheung Kwok-ming, 1979)
 The Secret (Ann Hui, 1979)
 The Butterfly Murders (Tsui Hark, 1979)
 The Spooky Bunch (Ann Hui, 1980)
 We're Going to Eat You (Tsui Hark, 1980)
 Dangerous Encounters of the First Kind (Tsui Hark, 1980)
 The Sword (Patrick Tam, 1980)
 Father and Son (Allen Fong, 1981)
 Love Massacre (Patrick Tam, 1981)
 The Club (Kirk Wong, 1981)
 All the Wrong Clues for the Right Solution (Tsui Hark, 1981)
 The Story of Woo Viet (Ann Hui, 1981)
 The Imp (Dennis Yu, 1981)
 Boat People (Ann Hui, 1982)
 Nomad (Patrick Tam, 1982)
 Zu Warriors from the Magic Mountain (Tsui Hark, 1983)
 Health Warning (Kirk Wong, 1983)
 Ah Ying (Allen Fong, 1983)
 Hong Kong, Hong Kong (Clifford Choi, 1983)
 Homecoming (Yim Ho, 1984)
 Love in a Fallen City (Ann Hui, 1984)
 Shanghai Blues (Tsui Hark, 1984)

Second Wave (1984-1990s) 

 The Illegal Immigrant (Mabel Cheung, 1985)
 Love Unto Waste (Stanley Kwan, 1986)
 An Autumn's Tale (Mabel Cheung, 1987)
 Rouge (Stanley Kwan, 1987)
 Cagemen (Jacob Cheung, 1992)
 As Tears Go By (Wong Kar Wai, 1988)
 Days of Being Wild (Wong Kar Wai, 1990)
 Chungking Express (Wong Kar Wai, 1994)
 Made in Hong Kong (Fruit Chan, 1997)

Notable directors
 Alex Cheung Kwok Ming (章國明)
 Allen Fong (方育平)
 Ann Hui (許鞍華)
 Clifford Choi (蔡繼光) 
 Dennis Yu (余允抗)
 Fruit Chan (陳果)
 John Woo (吳宇森)
 Kirk Wong (黃志強)
 Patrick Tam (譚家明)
 Tsui Hark (徐克)
 Wong Kar-wai (王家衛)
 Yim Ho (嚴浩)

References

External links
 The rise of Hong Kong New Wave cinema on GB Times
 Screening the Past article about a HK New Wave book
 The 30 Best Hong Kong Movies of All Time on Taste of Cinema (featuring HK New Wave titles by John Woo and Wong Kar Wai)

New Wave
New Wave in cinema
Movements in cinema
1970s in film
1980s in film
1990s in film
2000s in film